London was an electoral riding in Ontario, Canada. It was created in 1867 at the time of confederation and was abolished in 1925 before the 1926 election. It was re-established in 1934 and existed until 1955 when it was abolished again.

Members of Provincial Parliament

References

Former provincial electoral districts of Ontario